Pristimantis museosus is a species of frog in the family Strabomantidae.
It is endemic to Panama.
Its natural habitat is tropical moist montane forests.
It is threatened by habitat loss.

References

museosus
Endemic fauna of Panama
Amphibians of Panama
Amphibians described in 1994
Taxonomy articles created by Polbot